Laurence Meyer (born March 8, 1944) is an American economist who served as a member of the Federal Reserve Board of Governors from 1996 to 2002.

Meyer received a B.A. (magna cum laude) from Yale University in 1965 and a Ph.D. in economics from the Massachusetts Institute of Technology in 1970. He then taught at Washington University in St. Louis for 27 years.

Meyer also ran an economic consulting firm, Laurence H. Meyer and Associates, with two former students. He won several economic forecasting awards while running the company.  After he moved to the US Fed, he sold his interest in the firm and it was renamed Macroeconomic Advisers.

In 1996, he and Alice Rivlin were nominated to the Fed by US President Bill Clinton. At the Fed, Meyer was one of the governors most ready to raise interest rates, because he believed that the economy was operating near full capacity, and especially that the employment rate was near the non-accelerating inflation rate of unemployment, or the rate that would cause inflation. Alan Greenspan, the chairman at that time, was one of the leaders of the idea that improved productivity would allow the Fed to keep interest rates low without causing inflation.

After leaving the Fed, Meyer became a Distinguished Scholar at the Center for Strategic and International Studies. He also founded Monetary Policy Analytics, Inc. dba LH Meyer

Publications

External links 
 Meyer's speech "Come with me to the FOMC"
 Macroeconomic Advisers biography
 CSIS biography
 Interview with the Minneapolis Fed
 Statements and Speeches of Laurence H. Meyer
 Monetary Policy Analytics Inc. Site
 

1944 births
21st-century American economists
Economists from New York (state)
Federal Reserve System governors
Living people
MIT School of Humanities, Arts, and Social Sciences alumni
People from the Bronx
Washington University in St. Louis faculty
Yale University alumni
Clinton administration personnel
George W. Bush administration personnel